The Knights Hospitaller operated a wide network of properties in the Middle Ages from their successive seats in Jerusalem, Acre, Cyprus, Rhodes and eventually Malta. In the early 14th century, they received many properties and assets previously in the hands of the Knights Templar.

Middle East

Kingdom of Jerusalem
This includes both the Kingdom of Jerusalem and its Vassal entities. 
 The eponymous hospital, in the Christian Quarter of Jerusalem's neighborhood now known as Muristan just south of the Church of the Holy Sepulchre, including the Church of Saint John the Baptist, 1099–1187. The Templars also held the Church of Saint Mary of the Germans for a brief period until 1244. 
 The Hospitaller commandery of Saint-Jean-d'Acre, ca. 1130–1187 and 1191–1291; the Hospitallers administered the whole city of Acre from 1229 to its fall in 1291. 
 Bayt Jibrin (Beth Gibelin) northwest of Hebron, 1136–1187
 the Benedictine monastery in Abu Ghosh near Jerusalem, built by the Hospitallers in 1140
 Belmont Castle by Suba near Jerusalem, 1160s–1187
 Aqua Bella (Arabic Khirbat Iqbalā), now Ein Hemed west of Jerusalem
 Arsur (Arabic Arsuf, ancient Apollonia) on the coast south of Netanya, 1261–1268
 Qalansawe (Calanson) inland from Netanya, 1128–1187 and 1191–1265
 Burgata north of Qalansawe, 1248–1265
 Tel Dothan (Castellum Beleismum or Chateau Saint-Job) southwest of Jenin, in 1187
 Qula, northeast of Ramla, in the 12th century
 Cafarlet, now Kafr Lam south of Haifa, 1232–1255
 Tel Yokneam (Caymont or Cain Mons) southeast of Haifa, 1256–1262
 Tel Afek (Recordane) east of Haifa, 1154–1291
 Taibe (Le Forbelet) in the Valley of Megiddo, until 1187
 Mount Tabor fortress, 1255–1263
 Belvoir Castle (Arabic Kawkab al-Hawa) near the Sea of Galilee, 1168–1189
 Banias (ancient Caesarea Philippi) near Mount Hermon, briefly around 1157
 Hunin (Castellum Novum or Chastel Neuf) at the Northern tip of Israel, also around 1157

County of Tripoli
 The Krak des Chevaliers (Hisn al-Akrad), the Hospitallers' major fortress in the Levant, 1142–1271
 Margat (Marqab) on the Syrian coast south of Latakia, the Knights' other major redoubt, 1186–1285
 Coliath or La Colée (Qalaat al-Qlaiaat), near the coast north of Tripoli
 Gibelacar (Hisn Ibn Akkar) in Northern Lebanon, 1170–1203
 Chastel Rouge (Qal’at Yahmur) on the coast just north of the Lebanese-Syrian border, ca. 1177–1289
 Arab al-Mulk (Belda or Beaude, in Arabic also Balda al-Milk or Beldeh) near Margat, 1160s–1271
 Qurfays (Corveis) also near Margat, until 1271

Armenian Kingdom of Cilicia
 Silifke Castle (Le Selef, ancient Seleucia) in modern Turkey, 1210–1226
 Tokmar Castle near Silifke, also from 1210

Aegean Sea Region

 the Hospital of Sampson in Constantinople, which the Hospitallers managed under the Latin Empire's rule until 1261
 The Hospitallers also operated hospitals in Negroponte and Corinth
 Kolossi Castle near Limassol in Cyprus, 1210–1570 with an interruption in 1306–1313. Limassol was the main seat of the Order between the fall of Acre in 1291 and the move to Rhodes in 1310
 Gastria Castle in Cyprus, from 1308
 Islands of the Dodecanese: 
 Kastellorizo, 1306–1440
 Rhodes, 1306–1522 (the city of Rhodes 1310–1522)

 Tilos, 1309–1470
 Symi, 1309–1522
 Nisyros, 1315–1522
 Kos, 1337–1523
 Kalymnos, 1310–1522
 Leros, 1309–1522
 Smyrna, in whose conquest the Hospitallers took part and 1344 and whose defense they assumed 1374–1402 
 The Principality of Achaea by lease from Joanna I of Naples, 1376–1381
 Corinth, 1397–1404
 Bodrum Castle, 1402–1523

Western Europe

References to countries below are using 21st-century borders.

France
  in Saint-Gilles, Gard, 1109–1792
 Hospital of the Holy Ghost, Montpellier, est. 1145
 Château de Condat, Dordogne, since the 12th century
 Hospice of Saint John, Nice
 Fort Saint-Jean (Marseille), initially built by the Hospitallers in the late 12th century
 , 1317–1789
 , 1562–1792
  in Colmar, initially built in 1608

Italy
 Hospital of the Holy Sepulchre and Saint John, Pisa, est. 1113
 Ospedaletto in Verona, from 1154
 Ospedale dei Pellegrini, Asti, from 1182
 Hospital of San Sepolcro at the Ponte Vecchio, Florence, 1213–1808
 Abbey of Santissima Trinità, Venosa, after 1297
 Casa dei Cavalieri di Rodi in Rome, built in the late 13th century
 Hospital of San Giovanni a Maruggio, Brindisi, from 1300
 San Giovanni di Malta, Venice, transferred from the Templars in 1312
 Church of San Giovannino dei Cavalieri in Florence
 Ospedale dei Pellegrini, Naples, since 1564
 Ricetta di Malta, Augusta, Sicily, 17th–18th centuries

Iberian Peninsula
 Castle of La Muela, Spain, since 1183
 Royal Monastery of Santa María de Sigena, 1183–1936
 Igreja de Santa Luzia (Lisbon), still owned by the Order

Germany, Switzerland, Austria, Poland
 Mailberg Castle, Austria, since 1146
 Münchenbuchsee Commandery, Switzerland, since 1180
 Church of Saint John of Jerusalem outside the walls in Poznań, Poland, since 1187
 Ritterhaus Bubikon near Rapperswil, Switzerland, since the 1190s
 Thunstetten Commandery, Switzerland, since the early 13th century
 Maltese Church, Vienna, since 1217
 the Principality of Heitersheim in the Breisgau, 1262–1806, Imperial Estate from 1548
 Compesières Commandry near Geneva, Switzerland, since 1270
 Sonnenburg, now Słońsk in Poland, 1426–1945
 Ordenspalais in Berlin, 1738–1811
 Kastl Abbey, 1773–1803
 Biburg Abbey, 1781–1808
 Former Jesuit college and Church of Saint George in Amberg, Bavaria (1782–1808)

Great Britain and Ireland
 Torphichen Preceptory, Scotland, since the 1140s
 St John's Jerusalem, Sutton-at-Hone, England, est. 1199
 Clerkenwell Priory in London, the Order's seat in England
 Knights Hospitaller Gallery, Quenington, England
 Hospital Church in Hospital, County Limerick
 West Peckham Preceptory, England, since the early 15th century

Tripoli and Malta

After the Ottoman conquest of Rhodes in 1522, the Knights made stops in Candia, Messina, Bacoli near Naples, and Civitavecchia. Pope Adrian VI provisionally relocated the Order in Viterbo, where they stayed from 1523 to 1527. Then at the invitation of Charles III, Duke of Savoy, they moved to Nice and nearby Villefranche. On 24 July 1530 in Bologna, Emperor Charles V granted them a new permanent base.
 Tripoli, 1530–1551, where the Hospitallers' church stood on the same location as the Sidi Darghut Mosque
 Malta and Gozo, 1530–1798

Other locations
 Banate of Severin, 1247–1260
 Saint Barthélemy, Saint Kitts, Saint Croix and Northern Saint Martin, 1651–1665 during the Hospitaller colonization of the Americas

Since 1798

Following the expulsion of the Order from Malta by Napoleon in 1798, the Order's remnants temporarily relocated in Messina until 1802, Catania until 1826, and Ferrara until 1834. Gotland was offered to the knights by Sweden in 1806, but they refused as they still hoped to reclaim sovereignty over Malta. The Order then settled in its long-held properties in Rome, which were granted extraterritoriality in 1869. In that period it assumed its modern name of Sovereign Military Order of Malta. 
 Villa del Priorato di Malta, Rome, Templar property transferred in 1312, with the Santa Maria del Priorato Church
 Palazzo Malta, Rome, acquired in 1630
 , since 1938
 Casa dei Cavalieri di Rodi, Rome, since 1946
 Villa Pagana in Rapallo, since 1959
 Saint John's Cavalier, part of the Fortifications of Valletta, leased since 1967 by the Order as its embassy in Malta
 Villa Malta (Cologne), since 1971
 Fort St. Angelo, Birgu, Malta (upper part), since 2001
 See also the list of diplomatic missions of the Sovereign Military Order of Malta

In Protestant countries

The Order of Saint John (Bailiwick of Brandenburg) (Johanniter) had become autonomous in 1538, and was dissolved in 1811. Since restoration in 1852 it has had its seat in Berlin until World War II, then Bad Pyrmont until 1952, Rolandseck until 1962, Bonn until 2001, Berlin-Lichterfelde until 2004, and since 2004 Potsdam as formal seat even though the main office remains in Lichterfelde. Its activities include the Johanniter-Unfall-Hilfe.

The British Order of Saint John, formed in 1831 and chartered in 1888, manages several facilities in Jerusalem under the Saint John Eye Hospital Group, as well as the international St John Ambulance network. Its London headquarters, at St John's Gate, Clerkenwell, hosts the Museum of the Order of St John.

The Order of Saint John in Sweden was founded in 1920 following the disruption of the Johanniter in Northern Europe during World War I. Its headquarters is hosted by the House of Nobility in Stockholm.

The  was created in 1946 in a similar development following World War II. It is headquartered at 48 Lange Voorhout in The Hague.

Johanniter International, a partnership of the four Protestant Orders of St. John and their national charities, was founded in 2000 and is headquartered in Brussels.

See also
 List of Knights Templar sites
 Ordensburg
 Commanderies of the Order of Saint John

Notes

Knights Hospitaller
Knights Hospitaller
Knights Hospitaller sites